Ghorpuri (Ghorpadi) is a village in Kavathe-Mahankal Pune district in the Indian state of Maharashtra.

Demographics 
Its population is 2,109.

Amenities 
Many Ghorpuri bungalows are owned by British colonies. Nearby organizations include the National War Museum and the Army Public School. Ghorpuri Village is near the Sangli Miraj Kupwad municipality town of Maharashtra.

Education
Schools in Ghorpuri include St. Joseph High School, Ghorpuri Village High School, Swami Vivekanand, Basant, Saraswati Vidyalaya, and Shahid Bhagat Singh High School.

Religion
Shrinath Mhaskoba temple is a notable place in the Ghorpuri area.

Ghorpuri is home to St. Joseph's Catholic Church and St. Mary's Orthodox Syrian Church.

Transport
A railroad station is present.

Health care 
Ghorpuri is home to Talyan Home Nursing & First Aid Training Center.
Nursing homes include Dr Bumb Nursing Home, Usha Nursing Home, and Dr. Shobha Ahuja Nursing Home.

Ghorpuri is home to Matruseva Hospital, Sanjeevani Hospital, and many others.

Ghorpuri hosts Aakash Eye Clinic And Laser Centre, Neo Vision Eye Care, and many others.

References

Villages in Pune district